The Mozambican Nationalist Movement is a political party in Mozambique. In the last elections for the Assembly of the Republic held on 1 and 2 December 2004, the party was part of the Renamo-UE electoral alliance, that got 29.7% of the popular vote and 90 out of 250 seats. The presidential candidate of this alliance, Afonso Dhlakama, got 31.7% of the popular vote.

Nationalist parties in Africa
Political parties in Mozambique